Assholes: A Theory is a 2012 non-fiction book by Aaron James. An associate professor of philosophy at the University of California, Irvine, James attempts a precise academic definition of the term. According to James, an asshole "allows himself to enjoy special advantages in social relations out of an entrenched sense of entitlement that immunizes him against the complaints of other people." As Martin Patriquin writes in Maclean's, the author "spends 214 quite convincing pages arguing that “assholeness” is less inattention than a permanent state of mind [...]" "Seekers of philosophical meaning will find much to ponder with James", concludes Alex Balk in Slate.

The book inspired a 2019 documentary film of the same name, by director John Walker.

See also
 The No Asshole Rule

References

External links
 Official documentary film website: Assholes: A Theory (film) 

2012 non-fiction books
English-language books
Sociology books
Doubleday (publisher) books